Jim McManus (born 19 May 1940, in Bristol) is a British actor, who has starred in various television, stage and film roles, including Tipping the Velvet, Lawless Heart and Only Fools and Horses. In the 1970s he appeared in the Doctor Who serial The Invisible Enemy. He has also starred in the popular television drama Heartbeat and twice in critically acclaimed drama Minder. He's also been a voice actor in the 1997 TV series The Treacle People and the 2007 animated film Quest for a Heart.

McManus briefly played Aberforth Dumbledore (credited as "Barman") in the fifth Harry Potter film, Harry Potter and the Order of the Phoenix in 2007. He also had roles in Silver Dream Racer (1980), Just Ask for Diamond (1988), Buddy's Song (1991) and Easy Virtue (2008), and featured in the 2014 film Pride, directed by Matthew Warchus.

Filmography

Film

Television

Video games

References

External links 
 

1940 births
Living people
British male film actors
British male television actors
21st-century British male actors
20th-century British male actors